The City of Purple Dreams is a 1928 American silent drama film directed by Duke Worne and starring Barbara Bedford, Robert Frazer and David Torrence.

Cast
 Barbara Bedford as Esther Strom 
 Robert Frazer as Daniel Randolph 
 David Torrence as Symington Otis 
 Jacqueline Gadsdon as Kathleen Otis 
 Paul Panzer as Slug Nikolay 
 Jack Carlyle as Kelly 
 Henry Roquemore as Quigg

References

External links
 

1928 films
1928 drama films
1920s English-language films
American silent feature films
Silent American drama films
American black-and-white films
Films directed by Duke Worne
Rayart Pictures films
1920s American films